The Summit Open Source Development Group is a non-profit organization formed in 2000. 
The group encourages the development of open-source software, anti-abuse/spam fighting spam methods, and is run by a small volunteer team of senior staff members with multiple standard staff members maintaining the various sub-projects.

There are three distinctive generations of the SOSDG, with each timeframe representing an evolution of the group's goals and focus.

The first generation was headed and formed by Brian Bruns, and ran from 2000 until 2002 when it was shut down for unspecified reasons.  The group maintained an early port of ircII EPIC to the Windows platform, provided a free hosting and development platform for Open Source and Free Software developers, and created the 2mbit Blackhole List (a predecessor of the modern AHBL).

The second generation was formed in 2003 by three of the previous generation's senior members, and headed by Andrew Kirch.  The group focused on development of a new anti-abuse and spam fighting platform collectively known as The Abusive Hosts Blocking List, as well as created Windows ports of ClamAV, a new improved ircII EPIC client, and several other software packages.  In late 2006 and early 2007, this generation was being phased out.

The third and most recent generation was officially formed in 2007, once again under the guidance of Andrew Kirch and Brielle Bruns but with a much more comprehensive administration team and a completely redesigned network infrastructure based on Xen virtualization technologies.  The group once again returned focus to hosting and software development and spun the AHBL into a separate group (but still under the SOSDG's management).

Among its current projects, the group hosts The Abusive Hosts Blocking List, a Linux kernel LXR, a Windows NT/2000/XP/2003 Cygwin port of ClamAV and ircII EPIC, ircII EPIC4-OpenVMS, ircII EPIC4-OSX, mod_access_rbl2 (a re-ported version of mod_access_rbl for use in Apache 1.3.x), CeeMedia Media Catalogue, and The Raptor HPC project.   The Raptor HPC Project is headed by SOSDG Volunteer Systems Engineer Gregory Taylor out of Seattle, WA to create a fully functional open source mini HPC cluster system for military, medical and research applications on a modified Hypercube computer model.

In 2005, the group was named as a defendant in the lawsuit Scoville Et Al., vs. Bruns et al., due to its maintainership of the AHBL.  The suit was dismissed on January 6, 2006 for lack of jurisdiction.

References

External links
Official site
Linux Kernel LXR

Free and open-source software organizations